Czechoslovak  may refer to:
A demonym or adjective pertaining to Czechoslovakia (1918–93)
First Czechoslovak Republic (1918–38)
Second Czechoslovak Republic (1938–39)
Third Czechoslovak Republic (1948–60)
Fourth Czechoslovak Republic (1960–89)
Fifth Czechoslovak Republic (1989–93)
Czechoslovak, also Czecho-Slovak, any grouping of the Czech and Slovak ethnicities:
As a national identity, see Czechoslovakism
The title of Symphony no. 8 in G Major op. 88 by Antonín Dvořák in 1889/90
The Czech–Slovak languages, a West Slavic dialect continuum
The Czechoslovak language, a theoretical standardized form defined as the state language of Czechoslovakia in its Constitution of 1920
Comparison of Czech and Slovak

See also
 Slovak Republic (disambiguation)
 Czech Republic (disambiguation)
 Czechia (disambiguation)
 Slovak (disambiguation)
 Czech (disambiguation)